This is a list of matches of WFC Zhytlobud-1 Kharkiv in Europe. Created in 2006, the club is considered a descendent of WFC Arsenal Kharkiv and some sources combine records of the two clubs.

Overall record
Accurate as of 6 August 2022

Legend: GF = Goals For. GA = Goals Against. GD = Goal Difference.

Results

Games record

References 

Europe
Ukrainian football clubs in international competitions